Karate at the 2015 Pacific Games in Port Moresby, Papua New Guinea was held on July 13–14, 2015.

Medal summary

Medal table

Men's Results

Women's Results

References

2015 Pacific Games
Pacific Games